Bowling Green City Schools is a school district in northwest Ohio, the United States. The school district serves students who live in the city of Bowling Green located in Wood County including the villages of Portage, Rudolph, Sugar Ridge, Milton Center and Custar.

It is the second largest school district in Wood County, after Perrysburg Exempted Village School District.

History

Dr. Ann McVey took over as Superintendent in January 2011, replacing Hugh Caumartin who retired in December 2010 after 13½ years as Superintendent. In 2009, Bowling Green Middle School opened for students in grades 7 and 8. The former Junior High that once stood on W. Wooster Street was demolished in 2012 and is now used as the Wooster Green.

In Fall of 2019 the Bowling Green Middle School began using virtual reality headsets to teach history classes.

Grades 9–12
Bowling Green High School

Grades 6–8
Bowling Green Middle School

Grades K–5
Conneaut Elementary
Crim Elementary 
Kenwood Elementary School

Kenwood Elementary School

Kenwood Elementary has 490 students as of 2014.

History
On April 9, 2013, which was Arbor day, the fifth grade students of the school were involved in helping with the maintenance of existing trees in Bowling Green. At the end, a sugar maple tree was planted on the south side of the school.

On November 8, 2013, Kenwood Elementary received a call from Bowling Green Police Division at 11:45 a.m and was locked down. Nobody was injured during the incident.

Notable alumni 
Bob Latta – Member of the U.S. House of Representatives

Grade(s) PK
Bowling Green Preschool

References

External links
District website

School districts in Wood County, Ohio